Hulchul may refer to:
Hulchul (1951 film), a Hindi film
Hulchul (1971 film), a Bollywood thriller film
Hulchul (1995 film), a Hindi action film
Hulchul (2004 film), a Hindi-language romantic comedy-drama film
Hulchul (2019 film), a Telugu-language film